is a Japanese long-distance runner.

He competed in the 2006 (junior) and 2007 (senior) IAAF World Cross Country Championships.

He finished seventh at the 2016 Chicago Marathon.  He was the top non-African finisher.

References

Living people
1987 births
Japanese male long-distance runners
Japanese male marathon runners
Japanese male cross country runners